'The Adelaide Repertory Theatre, often called Adelaide Rep or The Rep, is an amateur theatre company in Adelaide, South Australia, founded in 1908. It usually presents its productions at The Arts Theatre.

History
Adelaide Rep is the longest surviving amateur theatre company in the Southern Hemisphere,
having been set up in 1908 by students from the Elder Conservatorium.

Since its inception, the company's venues have included:
 Unley Town Hall
 Walkerville Hall
 Queen's Hall at 102a Grenfell Street (later the Embassy Ballroom, Plaza Theatre, and Paris Cinema, before demolition)
King's Theatre (built 1911, on the corner of Carrington Street and King William Street, Adelaide)
Tivoli Theatre (now Her Majesty's)
Victoria Hall, in Gawler Place 

In 1963, the company built The Arts Theatre in Angas Street in the Adelaide city centre. The 500-seat theatre was built for £45,000, on land bought 15 years prior by the company. It has since become a major venue for other amateur companies as well as Adelaide Fringe and other performances. The first production there was the Peter Ustinov comedy, Romanoff and Juliet.

Description
The company has performed at many venues around Adelaide, but most are at The Arts Theatre.

The company is run by a board,  chaired by Rose Vallen.

Awards
2001: Messenger Newspapers Light Year Award, for Glen Christie's performance as Norman in The Dresser
2001: Messenger Newspapers Theatre Awards, for Barney in Kid Stakes won Best Amateur Actor
2006: Adelaide Critics Circle The Coopers Group Award for School for Scandal
2006: Messenger Newspapers Light Year Award for best comedy: I Hate Hamlet
2008: Ruby Award for Sustained Contribution by an Organisation (Arts SA)

People
Notable associates of the Theatre include:
Roxy Byrne - actress
Frank Ford AM - Director 
Alexander Melrose - playwright
Keith Michell - Actor
Jean Robertson - actress
Sydney Talbot Smith - Chairperson, Vice President and President at times between 1919 and 1948

Footnotes

References

External links

Adelaide Repertory Theatre in the Adelaide Theatre Guide
Adelaide Repertory Theatre at AusStage

Performing arts in Adelaide
Amateur theatre companies in Australia
Performing groups established in 1908
1908 establishments in Australia